Michael Blair Choice (born November 10, 1989) is an American professional baseball outfielder who is a free agent. Choice played in Major League Baseball (MLB) for the Oakland Athletics and Texas Rangers, and in the Korea Baseball Organization (KBO) for the Nexen Heroes.

Choice played college baseball at the University of Texas at Arlington before the Athletics made him their first round draft pick in 2010.  He made his MLB debut with the Athletics in 2013, and played for the Rangers in 2014 and 2015.

Amateur career
Choice attended Mansfield Timberview High School in Arlington, Texas. He played for the school's baseball team as a catcher and pitcher. He had a .506 batting average during his senior year.

Though universities in the Big 12 Conference scouted Choice, he received his only scholarship offer from the University of Texas at Arlington (UTA), where he played college baseball for the Texas–Arlington Mavericks baseball team of the Southland Conference. Due to the number of catchers and middle infielders on the team, Choice played as a center fielder. As a freshman in 2008, Choice led the team in with a .376 batting average, seven home runs, and 51 runs batted in (RBIs). That year, Choice was named Second Team College Freshman All-American Outfielder and Southland Conference Freshman of the Year. In 2009, he was named Southland Conference All-Star Outfielder. In the summer of 2009, he played for the United States national baseball team in the World Baseball Challenge.

As a junior in 2010, Choice hit .393 with 16 home runs, a .568 on-base percentage, and a .704 slugging percentage. He was named First Team College All-American Outfielder, Southland Conference All-Star Outfielder, and Southland Conference Player of the Year. He was also named a semifinalist for the Golden Spikes Award, which is given to the best amateur baseball player of the year. In his three years at UTA, Choice batted .392 and hit a school-record 34 home runs.

Professional career

Oakland Athletics

The Oakland Athletics selected Choice with their first round pick, tenth overall, in the 2010 Major League Baseball Draft. Choice was the first UTA player to be drafted in the first round, and the highest selection in Southland Conference history, tying Ben Sheets of Louisiana-Monroe, who was selected tenth overall in 1999.

Choice signed with the Athletics on July 30 for a $2 million signing bonus. That season, he played for the Arizona League Athletics of the Rookie-level Arizona League and Vancouver Canadians of the Class-A Northwest League. In 2011, he played for the Stockton Ports of the Class-A Advanced California League, where he batted .283 with 30 home runs, along with 82 RBIs. Playing center field for the Midland RockHounds of the Class-AA Texas League, he batted .264 with six home runs and 43 RBIs in the first 69 games of the season, as he was named to appear in the 2012 All-Star Futures Game. His season ended prematurely due to a broken hand suffered when he was hit by a pitch in July.

Choice spent the 2013 season with the Sacramento River Cats of the Class AAA Pacific Coast League (PCL), where he batted .302 with 14 home runs and 89 RBIs in 132 games. The Athletics selected his contract on September 1, 2013.  He made his major league debut the following day.

Texas Rangers
On December 3, 2013, the Athletics traded Choice and infielder Chris Bostick to the Texas Rangers for outfielder Craig Gentry and pitcher Josh Lindblom. Choice made the Rangers' Opening Day roster. He hit his first career home run against the Houston Astros off of Kevin Chapman, becoming the first Rangers' player to hit his first career home run in a pitch-hit at-bat. Struggling with a .177 batting average, the Rangers demoted Choice to the Round Rock Express of the PCL in July. The Rangers promoted Choice back to the major leagues in August. His season ended when he strained his hamstring in September; he batted .182 for the Rangers.

Choice competed in spring training to become the Rangers' starting left fielder, but he struggled and was reassigned to minor league camp during the competition. Choice spent the 2015 season with Round Rock, and was designated for assignment on August 18.

Cleveland Indians
The Rangers traded Choice to the Cleveland Indians in exchange for cash considerations on August 21, and the Indians optioned him to the Columbus Clippers of the Class AAA International League. Choice finished the 2015 season with Columbus, and was designated for assignment after the season. He cleared waivers and was sent outright to Columbus, and invited to 2016 spring training as a non-roster player.

Baltimore Orioles
Choice began the 2017 season in the Baltimore Orioles organization. They assigned him to the Norfolk Tides of the International League, where he batted 1-for-26 in 10 games before he was released.

Milwaukee Brewers
On May 5, 2017, Choice signed a minor league deal with the Milwaukee Brewers. He played for the Biloxi Shuckers of the Class AA Southern League.

Nexen Heroes
On July 22, 2017, the Brewers sold Choice's contract to the Nexen Heroes of the KBO League. Choice re-signed with the Heroes for $600,000 on November 24, 2017. Choice batted .307 with 17 home runs in 46 games for Nexen, and was resigned for the 2018 season. He batted .258 with 17 home runs in 96 games, and Nexen released Choice on August 7, 2018.

Diablos Rojos del México
On August 16, 2018, Choice signed with the Diablos Rojos del México of the Mexican League. He became a free agent following the season.

Tigres de Quintana Roo
On April 19, 2019, Choice signed with the Tigres de Quintana Roo of the Mexican League. He was released on May 31, 2019.

Algodoneros de Unión Laguna
On June 29, 2019, Choice signed with the Algodoneros de Unión Laguna of the Mexican League.

Colorado Rockies
On December 17, 2019, Choice signed a minor league deal with the Colorado Rockies. Choice was released by the Rockies organization on May 30, 2020.

Algodoneros de Unión Laguna (second stint)
On April 8, 2021, Choice signed with the Algodoneros de Unión Laguna of the Mexican League. Choice hit .281/.369/.456 with 5 RBI in 16 games, but was released on June 10.

Acereros de Monclova
On June 18, 2021, Choice signed with the Acereros de Monclova of the Mexican League. In 3 games, he went 1 for 12 with no home runs or RBIs. On June 23, he was placed on the inactive list, and he was later released on August 8, 2021.

Lexington Legends
On August 9, 2021, Choice signed with the Lexington Legends of the Atlantic League of Professional Baseball. In 36 games, he slashed .328/.420/.518 with 1 home run and 6 RBIs before he was released on September 17, 2021.

Personal
Choice was born in Fort Worth, Texas. His father, Charles, worked as an engineer for Bell Helicopter, and his mother, Charea, worked as a schoolteacher.

Choice married his girlfriend, Jade, in October 2012. The couple have two children.

References

External links

KBO League statistics

1989 births
Living people
Acereros de Monclova players
African-American baseball players
Algodoneros de Unión Laguna players
American expatriate baseball players in Canada
American expatriate baseball players in Mexico
American expatriate baseball players in South Korea
Arizona League Athletics players
Baseball players from Fort Worth, Texas
Biloxi Shuckers players
Charros de Jalisco players
Columbus Clippers players
Diablos Rojos del México players
KBO League outfielders
Kiwoom Heroes players
Major League Baseball outfielders
Mexican League baseball left fielders
Midland RockHounds players
Norfolk Tides players
Oakland Athletics players
Phoenix Desert Dogs players
Round Rock Express players
Sacramento River Cats players
Stockton Ports players
Texas Rangers players
Tigres de Quintana Roo players
UT Arlington Mavericks baseball players
Vancouver Canadians players
21st-century African-American sportspeople
20th-century African-American people
Yaquis de Obregón players